The Venerable Josiah Playdell (1641–1707) was an Anglican priest in England. 

Playdell was born in Newnham on Severn and educated at Queen's College, Oxford and King's College, Cambridge Playdell was ordained in 1663 and became curate at Chipping Norton. He held livings at Cocking, Bristol, Lyminster and Nuthurst. He was Archdeacon of Chichester from 1679 until his death.

Notes 

1707 deaths
1641 births
Alumni of Brasenose College, Oxford
Archdeacons of Chichester
17th-century English Anglican priests
Alumni of King's College, Cambridge
People from Newnham on Severn